JN or Jn may refer to:
 Excel Airways (1994-2008, IATA airline designator)
 Livingston Compagnia Aerea (2012-2014, IATA airline designator), an Italian airline
 Jan Mayen (FIPS PUB 10-4 territory code), an island in the Arctic Ocean
 Gospel of John, in Christian scripture
 Johnson–Nyquist noise, electrical noise generated by random thermal motion in a conductor
 Jornal de Notícias, a Portuguese newspaper
 Jornal Nacional, a Brazilian flagship news program broadcast by Rede Globo
 Jornal Nacional, former title of the Portuguese news program Jornal da 8 that is broadcast by TVI
 al-Nusra Front, a Syrian militant group in the Syrian Civil War